Takamasa (written: , , , , ,  or ) is a masculine Japanese given name. Notable people with the name include:

, Japanese footballer
, Japanese judoka
, Japanese samurai
, Japanese daimyō
, Japanese photographer
, Japanese musician, known as Miyavi
, Japanese screenwriter
, Japanese footballer
, Japanese actor
, Japanese footballer
, Japanese architect

Japanese masculine given names